Borimasunggu is a village in Labakkang district, Pangkajene and Islands Regency in South Sulawesi province. Its population is 3840.

Climate
Borimasunggu has a tropical monsoon climate (Am) with moderate to little rainfall from July to September and heavy to very heavy rainfall from October to June.

References

Populated places in South Sulawesi